Univer Oguzsport is a Moldovan football club based in Comrat, Moldova. They have mostly played in the Divizia A, the second tier of Moldovan football. In the 2010–11 season they played in the top division, the Divizia Națională. The club is now functioning as a football school for children from 5 years to 17 years.

History
The club has operated under different names throughout its history:
Universitatea Comrat (1996–2003)
Gagauziya Comrat (2003–2015)
Gagauziya-Oguzsport (2015–2016)
CF Oguzport(2021-2022)
Univer-Oguzsport(2022-)
According to club chairman Anatoly Mavrodi, the club is named after Oghuz Turks, the club colors are based on the flag of Gagauzia and the club logo features a grey wolf since it is a Turkic symbol.

References

External links
 Profile at soccerway.com 

Football clubs in Moldova
Football clubs in Gagauzia
Association football clubs established in 1996
1996 establishments in Moldova